Luis Maldonado (died 1596) was a Roman Catholic prelate who was appointed as the first Bishop of Nueva Caceres (1595–1596).

Biography
Luis Maldonado was ordained a priest in the Order of Friars Minor. On 30 August 1595, he was appointed during the papacy of Pope Clement VIII as the first Bishop of Nueva Caceres. He died before he was consecrated in 1596.

References

External links and additional sources
 (for Chronology of Bishops) 
 (for Chronology of Bishops) 

16th-century Roman Catholic bishops in the Philippines
Bishops appointed by Pope Clement VIII
1596 deaths
Franciscan bishops